The Hohtälli is a mountain of the Swiss Pennine Alps, located southeast of Zermatt in the canton of Valais. It lies on the range that separates the Findel Glacier from the Gorner Glacier, between the Gornergrat and the Stockhorn. The Hohtälli is part of a ski area and features several ski runs leading down the mountain.

References

External links
 Hohtälli on Hikr

Mountains of the Alps
Mountains of Switzerland
Mountains of Valais